Hongcun  is a town in Yi County, Huangshan City, Anhui Province, China. It was formerly known as Jilian.

See also
List of township-level divisions of Anhui
Hongcun

References

Towns in Anhui
Huangshan City